Monticello Box or Monticello Box Canyon is a narrow canyon, a gap and a box canyon in the middle of the wider valley or glen of Monticello Canyon.  The two wider valleys are separated by a narrower canyon, with a gap and box canyon called the Monticello Box at its head.

References 

Valleys of New Mexico